Links is the third album by folk band Kerfuffle.

Track listing

Bonus tracks (Live at Priddy)

Personnel
Sam Sweeney (fiddle, djembe, Cajon, Udu)
Hannah James (Accordion, clogging, vocals)
Chris Thornton-Smith (Guitar)
Tom Sweeney (Bass guitar, backing vocals)

2006 albums
Kerfuffle albums